Versus God is a full-length album by Dillinger Four, released in 2000.

Critical reception
The Riverfront Times wrote that "not since the Monkees has a band been this seriously subversive about the music they play, themselves and the industry they work for, and that's a compliment to both the Dillingers and the Monkees." The Reno Gazette Journal praised the "sweet lead vocals and barking backups, sensitive neo-folk and blistering rallying cries, non-sequitur samples and experiments and 4-to-the-floor high-speed anthems."

In a 2020 interview, Matt Pryor of The Get Up Kids called Versus God "arguably one of the greatest Punk Rock albums."

Track listing
"Who Didn't Kill Bambi?" – 2:06
""Get Your Study Hall Outta My Recess."" – 1:50
"Maximum Piss & Vinegar" – 2:17
"Last Communion" – 2:53
"Suckers, Intl. Has Gone Public" – 2:02
"Total.Fucking.Gone.Song" – 2:38
"Music Is None of My Business" – 1:39
"Define 'Learning Disorder'" – 2:23
"Let Them Eat Thomas Paine" – 3:10
"Shiny Things Is Good." – 3:04
"J. Harris" – 2:00
"Q: How Many Punks Does It Take to Change a Lightbulb?" – 2:24
"Wreck the Place Fantastic" – 2:33

References

2000 albums
Dillinger Four albums
Hopeless Records albums